12 Hydrae is a probable astrometric binary star system located 202 light years away from the Sun in the equatorial constellation of Hydra. It has the Bayer designation D Hydrae; 12 Hydrae is the Flamsteed designation. This system is visible to the naked eye as a faint, yellow-hued star with a combined apparent visual magnitude of 4.32. It is moving closer to the Earth with a heliocentric radial velocity of −8.5 km/s.

This was found to be a double star by R. A. Rossiter in 1953, with the magnitude 13.7 companion having an angular separation of  along a position angle of 266°, as of 2016. The brighter, magnitude 4.32 component A is a spectroscopic binary.

It is 910 million years old with 2.32 times the mass of the Sun. After exhausting the hydrogen at its core and evolving off the main sequence, the star has swollen to 11.5 times the Sun's radius. It is radiating 77 times the luminosity of the Sun from its enlarged photosphere at an effective temperature of 4,968 K.

References

Hydra (constellation)
G-type giants
Hydrae, 12
Hydrae, D
3484
074918
012097
Durchmusterung objects
Double stars
Spectroscopic binaries